Odds and Evens  ( also known as Trinity: Gambling for High Stakes) is an Italian comedy movie directed in 1978 by Sergio Corbucci and starring the comedy team of Terence Hill and Bud Spencer.

In 1979 it was awarded with the Golden Screen Award along with Superman and Close Encounters of the Third Kind.

Plot 
Johnny Firpo, a US Navy Lieutenant, is competing in many competitions in Miami, including American football and speedboat racing. Charlie instead is a truck driver making deliveries in various places and ultimately must carry a tank full of dolphins. The two characters meet when some miscreants sabotage Johnny's speedboat. He thinks that it was Charlie who was eating a plate of beans, but in the end, they discover that the real culprits are a gang of illegal bookmakers, led by a man known as Paraboulis 'The Greek', who are controlling and rigging every gambling competition in Florida.

The Navy asks Johnny to infiltrate and dismantle the gang of bookmakers, giving him the tip to seek help of former gambler Charlie Firpo. Johnny eventually meets Charlie and proposes to work with him, but first Charlie disagrees because his acquaintance seems a clever, witty trickster and for his simple taste. In the end, however, the two combine to sabotage the gangsters' plots with gleeful fisticuffs in the ensuing melee. Amongst this backdrop, Charlie, in despair, finds out he is the illegitimate brother of Johnny during an escapade of his father—still alive unbeknownst to Charlie—who pretends to be blind in order to collect a pension. After Johnny was passed off as a runner with the horses and Charlie took part in a second meeting, the two brothers find out which houses the boss of the gang of bookmakers and Johnny will have to play with him and his henchmen in a poker game. Johnny wins but the boss does not intend to make it go away, so Charlie and Johnny greet the members of the band with a new and more powerful punch and brawl.

Cast 

Terence Hill: Johnny Firpo
Bud Spencer: Charlie Firpo
Jerry Lester: Mike Firpo
Luciano Catenacci: Paraboulis the Greek
Marisa Laurito: Sister Susanna		
Salvatore Borgese: Ninfus
Riccardo Pizzuti: Smilzo
Claudio Ruffini: Bugsy
Sergio Smacchi: Mancino
Carlo Reali: Admiral 
Vincenzo Maggio: Tappo
Woody Woodbury: Admiral O'Connor

Reception
The film was the second most popular Italian film of the 1978-79 season behind Amori miei.

References

External links

1978 films
1970s crime comedy films
Italian crime comedy films
Terence Hill and Bud Spencer
Films directed by Sergio Corbucci
Films scored by Guido & Maurizio De Angelis
Films set in the United States
Films about gambling
1978 comedy films
1970s Italian films